The 1932 United States presidential election in Mississippi took place on November 8, 1932, as part of the 1932 United States presidential election. Mississippi voters chose nine representatives, or electors, to the Electoral College, who voted for president and vice president.

Mississippi was won by Governor Franklin D. Roosevelt (D–New York), running with Speaker John Nance Garner, with 95.98% of the popular vote, against incumbent President Herbert Hoover (R–California), running with Vice President Charles Curtis, with 3.55% of the popular vote.

By percentage of the popular vote won, Mississippi was Roosevelt's second-best state; the only state in which he performed better was South Carolina, where he won 98.03% of the popular vote.

Results

References

Mississippi
1932
1932 Mississippi elections